Charlie Eastwood (born 11 August 1995 in Belfast) is a racing driver from Northern Ireland and an Aston Martin Factory driver having been a former junior.

Racing record

Career summary

† As Eastwood was a guest driver, he was ineligible to score points.
* Season still in progress.

Complete FIA World Endurance Championship results
(key) (Races in bold indicate pole position; races in italics indicate fastest lap)

* Season still in progress.

Complete 24 Hours of Le Mans results

Complete British GT Championship results
(key) (Races in bold indicate pole position) (Races in italics indicate fastest lap)

† As Eastwood was a guest driver, he was ineligible to score points.

Complete IMSA SportsCar Championship results
(key) (Races in bold indicate pole position; races in italics indicate fastest lap)

* Season still in progress.

Complete European Le Mans Series results
(key) (Races in bold indicate pole position; results in italics indicate fastest lap)

Complete Asian Le Mans Series results 
(key) (Races in bold indicate pole position) (Races in italics indicate fastest lap)

References

External links
 http://charlieeastwood.com/

1995 births
Living people
Sportspeople from Belfast
Porsche Carrera Cup GB drivers
Racing drivers from Northern Ireland
24 Hours of Daytona drivers
24 Hours of Le Mans drivers
FIA World Endurance Championship drivers
Blancpain Endurance Series drivers
Formula Renault Eurocup drivers
Formula Renault 2.0 NEC drivers
Toyota Racing Series drivers
24H Series drivers
British GT Championship drivers
British racing drivers
European Le Mans Series drivers
Asian Le Mans Series drivers
International GT Open drivers
WeatherTech SportsCar Championship drivers
Aston Martin Racing drivers
Strakka Racing drivers
M2 Competition drivers
AV Formula drivers
Karting World Championship drivers
Fortec Motorsport drivers
Nürburgring 24 Hours drivers
NACAM F4 Championship drivers